Pyotr Gayevsky (born 5 February 1888, date of death unknown) was a Russian Empire sprinter. He competed in the men's 400 metres at the 1912 Summer Olympics.

References

1888 births
Year of death missing
Athletes (track and field) at the 1912 Summer Olympics
Male sprinters from the Russian Empire
Olympic competitors for the Russian Empire
Place of birth missing
Sportspeople from Vitebsk